Asier Illarramendi "Illarra" Andonegi  (born 8 March 1990) is a Spanish professional footballer who plays for and captains Real Sociedad as a defensive midfielder.

He developed at Real Sociedad, appearing in 56 competitive matches with the first team and helping them qualify for the Champions League in 2013. He then transferred to Real Madrid for €32.2 million, the most they had ever paid for a Spanish player, returning to his first club for half of that fee two years later.

Illarramendi earned 31 caps for Spain from under-17 to under-23 level, winning the 2013 European Championship with the under-21 side. He made his senior debut in 2017.

Club career

Real Sociedad
A product of local Real Sociedad's youth system, Illarramendi was born in Mutriku, Gipuzkoa, and he spent the vast majority of his first four senior seasons with the B team, contributing with 27 games and two goals in 2009–10 as the Basques returned to Segunda División B after one year out. On 19 June 2010, in the last day of the Segunda División campaign, as the first team had already sealed promotion to La Liga as champions, he made his first official appearance, in a 4–1 away loss against Elche CF.

On 23 January 2011, Illarramendi made his top-division debut, in a 2–1 defeat at Villarreal CF. The following month, he first appeared as a starter playing the full 90 minutes in another away loss (4–1 against RCD Espanyol); the bulk of the season was spent, however, with the reserves in the third level.

Illarramendi started in all of his 32 league appearances in 2012–13, as Real Sociedad finished fourth and qualified to the UEFA Champions League for the first time in ten years. At the LFP Awards, he was named Breakthrough Player and Best Midfielder.

Real Madrid

On 12 July 2013, Illarramendi signed a six-year contract with Real Madrid for a fee of €32.2 million, the highest amount paid by the club for a Spanish player. He made his official debut on 14 September by starting in a 2–2 away draw against Villarreal, and scored his first goal on 18 December in a 2–0 home win over CD Olímpic de Xàtiva in the round of 32 of the Copa del Rey (also the aggregate score).

Illarramendi netted his first league goal for the Merengues on 22 February 2014, after his long-range effort against Elche was deflected and the hosts won it 3–0. His second came on 5 April, as he scored the first in an eventual 4–0 victory at former team Real Sociedad in the 44th minute; he was a regular in the domestic cup campaign, coming on as a late substitute for Ángel Di María in the 2–1 final defeat of FC Barcelona, adding 11 appearances – five starts – in the team's Champions League run but remaining on the bench as they clinched the trophy against Atlético Madrid in the final at the Estádio da Luz.

Illarramendi began his second year with a brief substitute appearance in the 2014 UEFA Super Cup triumph against compatriots Sevilla FC at the Cardiff City Stadium, and was also part of Real Madrid's squad which won the FIFA Club World Cup in Morocco, playing the entirety of the 4–0 semi-final over against Cruz Azul.

Return to Real Sociedad

On 26 August 2015, Illarramendi returned to Real Sociedad, signing a six-year deal– the transfer fee was not officially disclosed by the clubs, but was stated in the media as being between €15–17 million, around half of the figure paid in the opposite direction two years previously. He made his league debut in his second spell three days later, starting and being booked in a 0–0 home draw against Sporting de Gijón. He recorded his first goal for the team in his second spell on 25 October, in a 4–0 win at Levante UD.

In the 2016–17 campaign, Illarramendi had the second-highest number of interceptions across Europe's five major leagues behind only Chelsea's N'Golo Kante. However, he was also noted for his poor disciplinary record, having racked up ten yellow cards by March 2017 including one in each of his four previous games.

Illarramendi scored a career-best seven goals in 2017–18, including braces in home and away victories over Deportivo de La Coruña. He had already exceeded his professional output for his whole career by February with his fifth goal. 

On 30 August 2019, Illarramendi suffered a broken fibula in a Basque derby match against Athletic Bilbao; it was presumed the injury would keep him out for a few months, but it was found he required surgery to his shin and ankle ligaments, and he did not feature again prior to the season being halted in March 2020 due to the COVID-19 pandemic in Spain. The delay seemed to have given him time to return before its conclusion, but in June 2020 he suffered a further muscle injury on the training ground, and made no further appearances.

International career
Illarramendi helped Spain reach the final of the 2007 FIFA U-17 World Cup, featuring in all games but one. He missed one of the penalties in the final shootout, which allowed Nigeria to lift the trophy.

Illarramendi played 16 times for the under-21s, in two years. He represented them at the 2013 UEFA European Championship in Israel, being first choice as the nation won the competition and being selected in the team of the tournament.

Manager Julen Lopetegui first called up Illarramendi for the senior side in March 2017, ahead of a 2018 FIFA World Cup qualifier against Israel and a friendly with France. Additionally, he played for the Basque XI from 2013 onwards, scoring to open a 3–1 win over FIFA member Tunisia at the San Mamés Stadium on 30 December 2016.

Illarramendi made his debut for Spain on 7 June 2017, playing the full 90 minutes in a 2–2 friendly draw to Colombia in Murcia. He scored his first goal on 9 October of that year, netting the game's only in Israel for the World Cup qualifying campaign.

Career statistics

Club

International
Scores and results list Spain's goal tally first, score column indicates score after each Illarramendi goal.

Honours
Real Sociedad
Segunda División: 2009–10
Copa del Rey: 2019–20

Real Madrid
Copa del Rey: 2013–14
UEFA Champions League: 2013–14
UEFA Super Cup: 2014
FIFA Club World Cup: 2014

Spain U21
UEFA European Under-21 Championship: 2013

Individual
La Liga Awards: Breakthrough Player/Best Midfielder 2012–13

References

External links

1990 births
Living people
People from Debabarrena
Sportspeople from Gipuzkoa
Spanish footballers
Footballers from the Basque Country (autonomous community)
Association football midfielders
La Liga players
Segunda División players
Segunda División B players
Tercera División players
Real Sociedad B footballers
Real Sociedad footballers
Real Madrid CF players
Spain youth international footballers
Spain under-21 international footballers
Spain under-23 international footballers
Spain international footballers
Basque Country international footballers